Batu Manikar is a small town in Federal Territory of Labuan, Malaysia. The oldest chimney and Labuan Bird Park are located here.

Labuan